Carlos D. Bustamante is a population geneticist and a professor at Stanford University.

Early life and education
Bustamante is a native of Venezuela who immigrated to the United States at age seven. He attended Harvard University, from which he graduated with a bachelor's and later a doctorate in biology, along with a M.S. in statistics. After completing his Doctoral studies, Bustamante went on to study at Oxford University, focusing in Mathematical Genetics in 2001. From 2002 to 2009, Bustamante was a faculty member at Cornell University, publishing numerous works during this time.

Professional career
He has published over 100 works in peer-reviewed journals. For his contributions to population genetics he was awarded, in 2010, a MacArthur Fellowship grant, for "mining DNA sequence data to address fundamental questions about the mechanisms of evolution, the complex origins of human genetic diversity, and patterns of population migration."

Bustamante has said that he does not consider race to be a "meaningful way to characterize people", commenting that "In a global context there is no model of three, or five, or even 10 human races. There is a broad continuum of genetic variation that is structured, and there are pockets of isolated populations. Three, five, or 10 human races is just not an accurate model; it is far more of a continuum model." He observed, "If I walk from Cape Horn all the way to the top of Finland, every village looks like the village next to it, but at the extremes people are different."

In 2013, Bustamante found a link between the most recent common ancestor for both males and females in Homo sapiens. He found that there may be a link to the same time period and even the same region for both Y-chromosomal Adam and Mitochondrial Eve. This study rejected the idea that Mitochondrial Eve may have lived well before Y-chromosomal Adam. The study concludes, however, that not all the genetic material comes from these two ancestors and that the two never met and that most of the genome comes from numerous other ancestors.

In 2018, Bustamante carried out DNA testing of United States Senator Elizabeth Warren that concluded that "the vast majority" of Warren's ancestry is European, but that "the results strongly support the existence of an unadmixed Native American ancestor six to ten generations ago."

References

External links
Full Transcript: Dr. Carlos Bustamante, Professor of Biomedical Data Science and Genetics at Stanford, on Sequenced

Stanford University faculty
Living people
American geneticists
MacArthur Fellows
Year of birth missing (living people)
Harvard College alumni
Harvard Graduate School of Arts and Sciences alumni
Venezuelan emigrants to the United States